{{Automatic taxobox
| taxon = Typhlosyrinx
| image = Typhlosyrinx supracostata 001.jpg
| image_caption = Shell of Typhlosyrinx supracostata
| authority = Thiele, 1925
| synonyms_ref = 
| synonyms =
| type_species= Pleurotoma (Leucosyrinx) vepallida Martens, 1902 
| subdivision_ranks = Species
| subdivision = See text
| display_parents = 3
}}Typhlosyrinx is a genus of sea snails, marine gastropod mollusks in the family Raphitomidae.

This genus was created by Johannes Thiele in 1925 to accommodate Pleurotorna vepallida Martens, 1902. The genus remains little known because of the original scarcity of specimens in the museums. Deap-sea expeditions have since recovered more than 200 additional specimens from the South-East Asia and the South-West Pacific, mainly in the Muséum National d'Histoire Naturelle, Paris

Species
Species within the genus Typhlosyrinx include:
 Typhlosyrinx neocaledoniensis Bouchet & Sysoev, 2001
 Typhlosyrinx panamica Bouchet & Sysoev, 2001
 Typhlosyrinx praecipua (E. A. Smith, 1899)
 Typhlosyrinx supracostata (Schepman, 1913)
 Typhlosyrinx vepallida (Martens, 1902)
Species bought into synonymy
 Typhlosyrinx chrysopelex Barnard, 1963: synonym of Gymnobela chrysopelex (Barnard, 1963) (original combination)
 Typhlosyrinx pyrropelex Barnard, 1963: synonym of Xanthodaphne pyrropelex (Barnard, 1963) (original combination)
 Typhlosyrinx subrosea Barnard, 1963 accepted as Xanthodaphne subrosea'' (Barnard, 1963) (original combination)

References

External links
 Bouchet, P. & Sysoev, A., 2001. Typhlosyrinx-like tropical deep-water turriform gastropods (Mollusca, Gastropoda, Conoidea). Journal of Natural History 35: 1693-1715
 Bouchet, P.; Kantor, Y. I.; Sysoev, A.; Puillandre, N. (2011). A new operational classification of the Conoidea (Gastropoda). Journal of Molluscan Studies. 77(3): 273-308

 
Raphitomidae